Killer Queen is the stage name of Iván Solar Gil (born February 2, 1989), a Spanish drag performer and doctor most known for competing on the first season of Drag Race España, where she finished as runner-up to Carmen Farala and alongside Sagittaria.

Biography 
Iván Solar Gil was born on February 2, 1989, in Madrid, Spain. From a young age, he was very involved in his neighborhood church, and even taught catechism until his expulsion. He is a doctor specializing in family and community medicine, and works as an emergency room doctor in the Community of Madrid.

Artistic Career 
In 2019, Killer queen released the singles "No eres como yo" (You're not like me) and "Karma" with fellow Drag Race España contestant Ariel Rec. The next year, she represented Spain as a participant in the drag contest Latin Drag Race International. 

In 2021, she was announced as a contestant in the first season of Drag Race España, premiering in May 2021. Killer obtained her first win on the show in the season's fourth episode, and was up for elimination in the next episode, for which she had to compete in a lip sync to the song "Espectacular" by Fangoria against cast-mate Hugáceo Crujiente, who was eliminated. Killer made it to the season finale, competing  in a lip sync for the crown to the song "La gata bajo la lluvia" by Rocío Dúrcal against Sagittaria and Carmen Farala.

Afterwards, on October 26 of the same year, she appeared in the music video "My Pussy Is Like a Peach" by Choriza May, together with national and international drag artists like Kika Lorace and The Macarena.

Activism 
Killer Queen has claimed that "drag is political". She has also denounced the fact that many other drag queens have received offers of work in exchange for not taking a political stance. 

In 2021, the Transgender Association of Andalucía-Sylvia Rivera (la Asociación Trans de Andalucía-Sylvia Rivera) awarded Killer the T Prize for her medical work and commitment to the LGBTI community. 

In July 2022, for Pride Month, the Parliamentary Socialist Group invited Killer Queen to a round table about media in Spain's lower house of congress, the Congreso de los Diputados.

Filmography

Television

Theater 

 Gran Hotel de las Reinas

Discography

Singles

References

Living people
Drag Race España contestants
Spanish drag queens
1989 births